Last of the Great Mississippi Delta Bluesmen: Live in Dallas is a live blues album, recorded in Dallas, Texas, in October 2004 by Henry James Townsend, Joe Willie "Pinetop" Perkins, Robert Lockwood Jr. and David "Honeyboy" Edwards. At the event, the four blues legends were from 89 to 94 years old and represented the last performers of Delta blues from the 1920s. The concert was arranged by the 501(c)3 non-profit The Blue Shoes Project, which aims to preserve and spread awareness of roots music amongst students.

Two years after the concert, both Lockwood and Townsend were dead, and by early 2011, only Edwards was still alive. He died later that year.

Critical reception
In 2007, the album was nominated for Best Traditional Blues Album and won the following February at the 50th Grammy Awards. It was also nominated for a Blues Music Award for Traditional Blues Album of the Year. By January 2009, the album had sold less than 1,000 copies.

Track listing
Robert Lockwood Jr. – "King Biscuit Time" (McKinley Morganfield) – 2:55
Pinetop Perkins – "Chicken Shack" (Ike Turner) – 4:42
Henry Townsend – "It's Got to End Somewhere" (Tonwsend) – 3:56
David "Honeyboy" Edwards – "Catfish Blues" (Robert Petway) – 2:58
Pinetop Perkins – "Down in Mississippi" (J. B. Lenoir) – 3:36
Robert Lockwood Jr. – "Hangin' On" (Robert Lockwood, Jr.) – 5:17
Henry Townsend – "All My Money's Gone" (Roosevelt Sykes) – 4:57
David "Honeyboy" Edwards – "Sweet Home Chicago" (Robert Johnson) – 3:09
Pinetop Perkins – "Kansas City" (Jerry Leiber and Mike Stoller) – 4:53
Henry Townsend – "If I Asked You" (Townsend) – 6:08
Robert Lockwood Jr. – "Got to Find Me a Woman" (Lockwood) – 4:56
David "Honeyboy" Edwards – "Country Boy" (Muddy Waters) – 3:13
Pinetop Perkins – "Got My Mojo Working" (Preston Foster) – 5:11
Henry Townsend – "If You Don't Want Me" (Townsend) – 5:59
Robert Lockwood Jr. – "For You My Love" (Lockwood) – 4:37
David "Honeyboy" Edwards – "Apron Strings" (Edwards) – 1:49
Henry Townsend – "Blind Girl Blues" (Townsend) – 4:21
Robert Lockwood Jr. – "See See Rider" (Lena Arnet and Ma Rainey) – 3:55

Personnel
David Honeyboy Edwards
David "Honeyboy" Edwards – guitar and vocals

Robert Lockwood Jr.
Robert Lockwood Jr. – guitar and vocals
Charles "D. C." Carnes – guitar
Gus Hawkins – alto and tenor saxophone
Jimmy "Gator" Hoare – drums and backing vocals
Benny Mostella – trumpet
Maurice Reedus – tenor saxophone and backing vocals
Gene Schwartz – bass guitar
Robert "Red Top" Young – keyboards and backing vocals

Pinetop Perkins
Pinetop Perkins – piano and vocals
Diunna Greenleaf – backing vocals
Jonn Richardson – guitar
James Rose – drums
Stephen Schneider – harmonica

Henry Townsend
Henry Townsend – guitar, piano, and vocals
Larry Johnson – bass guitar
John May – bass guitar

Technical personnel
Anne E. Dyson – photography
Jeffry Dyson – executive production, production
Michael Dyson – executive production, production
Wade Griffith of Holt Design, Inc. – design
Paul Grupp – engineering, mastering, mixing
Scott Shuman – engineering, mastering, mixing, production

References

External links
The Blue Shoe Project
Facebook page
Last Great Legends MySpace profile
The Blue Shoe Project YouTube channel, including footage from the concert

2007 live albums
Charity albums
Collaborative albums
Grammy Award for Best Traditional Blues Album
Live blues albums
Delta blues albums